"Totally Nude Island" is the debut single by The Superions, a side project of Fred Schneider of The B-52s.  The single was released to iTunes Stores internationally as a digital download on October 31, 2008.  "Totally Nude Island (Ursula 1000 Remix)" was also released as a digital single on December 18, 2008.  Both the original version and the Ursula 1000 remix were remastered in 2009 and released with two more remixes by The Lolligags and Marshmallow Coast on The Superions EP by Happy Happy Birthday To Me Records as a digital download on January 19, 2010, the CD and Limited Edition 12" were released on February 23, 2010.

Track listing 
 "Totally Nude Island" 4:07

Notes
 The running time of the new remastered version on The Superions EP is 4:05

Personnel 
Band
 Fred Schneider - vocals
 Noah Brodie - keyboards
 Dan Marshall - programming

Production
 Producer: The Superions
 Mastering: Bob Katz at Digital Domain
 Additional Mixing: Robin Reumers at Digital Domain
 Management: Dave Brodie
 Artwork: Dan Marshall

References

The Superions songs
2008 songs
Songs written by Fred Schneider